Beastie Boys Music is a compilation album from American hip hop/rap rock group Beastie Boys, released on October23, 2020.

Critical reception
The editorial staff of AllMusic gave the release 4.5 out of five stars, with reviewer Stephen Thomas Erlewine, calling this a superior compilation to Solid Gold Hits, calling this, "the best Beastie Boys greatest hits yet assembled: it has all the major items, presented in a lively fashion".

Track listing
"So What'cha Want"– 3:36 (from Check Your Head, 1992)
"Paul Revere"– 3:41 (from Licensed to Ill, 1986)
"Shake Your Rump"– 3:19 (from Paul's Boutique, 1989)
"Make Some Noise"– 3:40 (from Hot Sauce Committee Part Two, 2011)
"Sure Shot"– 3:20 (from Ill Communication, 1994)
"Intergalactic"– 3:51 (from Hello Nasty, 1998)
"Ch-Check It Out"– 3:12 (from To the 5 Boroughs, 2004)
"(You Gotta) Fight for Your Right (To Party!)"– 3:29 (from Licensed to Ill, 1986)
"Pass the Mic"– 4:16 (from Check Your Head, 1992)
"Don't Play No Game That I Can't Win"– 4:11 (from Hot Sauce Committee Part Two, 2011)
"Body Movin'"– 3:09 (from Hello Nasty, 1998)
"Sabotage"– 2:58 (from Ill Communication, 1994)
"Hold It Now, Hit It"– 3:27 (from Licensed to Ill, 1986)
"Shadrach"– 4:08 (from Paul's Boutique, 1989)
"Root Down"– 3:32 (from Ill Communication, 1994)
"Brass Monkey"– 2:37 (from Licensed to Ill, 1986)
"Get It Together"– 4:05 (from Ill Communication, 1994)
"Jimmy James" (Single Version)– 3:04 (from Check Your Head, 1992)
"Hey Ladies"– 3:47 (from Paul's Boutique, 1989)
"No Sleep till Brooklyn"– 4:09 (from Licensed to Ill, 1986)

Personnel
Beastie Boys
Ad-Rock
MCA
Mike D

Guest musicians
Q-Tip on "Get It Together"
Santigold on "Don't Play No Game That I Can't Win"

Charts

References

External links

2020 greatest hits albums
Beastie Boys compilation albums
Universal Music Enterprises compilation albums